There are several state parks named Twin Lakes State Park:
 Twin Lakes State Park (Iowa)
 Twin Lakes State Park (Michigan)
 Twin Lakes State Park (Virginia)